"Red Hot Catholic Love" is the 87th episode of the Comedy Central series South Park. It originally aired on July 3, 2002. It was selected No. 2 on the "10 South Parks that Changed the World" list, and was also part of "South Park's Dirty Dozen". In the episode, Father Maxi travels to the Vatican to confront the growing problem of Catholic priests molesting children. Meanwhile, Cartman discovers that it is possible to defecate from the mouth.

Plot
The parents of South Park are a bit concerned when Father Maxi informs them about the Young Men's Catholic Retreat and agree that they do not want their kids to go. They also decide to have a counselor talk to the boys to find out if the priest had been molesting them. The counselor, assuming the children were molested, asks, "Did Father Maxi, at any time, ever try to put something in your butt?" Having never been abused by Father Maxi, the boys are completely baffled about the question's meaning. Cartman has a "brilliant" idea, reasoning she meant it could be possible that eating food through the rectum can cause defecation through the mouth. The other boys (especially Kyle) think it is stupid and disgusting, and Cartman bets him $20 it will work. While the counselor is questioning the boys, all the parents decide to become atheists, as the sexual molestation scandals have destroyed their faith in Catholicism and God.

Cartman ultimately does defecate out of his mouth, winning the bet and continually boasts the fact to Kyle, who becomes increasingly angered by it. News of this spreads, and it is concluded nationwide that this method of eating is much healthier than the traditional method (with the surgeon general basing that on "absolutely nothing"). The adults of South Park immediately adopt the new method of eating, calling it interorectogestion and even start passing trash cans around at social situations to openly collect the waste (literally "spewing crap from their mouths"), completely disregarding the previously long-held custom that defecation should occur in private.

Meanwhile, Maxi has gathered a meeting of Catholic priests in Colorado to discuss the problem of child molestation. Maxi is appalled by such behavior and wants it to cease entirely, but to Maxi's horror, all of the other priests there have molested their altar boys. Maxi decides he has to go to the Vatican. Once there, he quickly finds the same: priests from all over the world (and from other worlds, specifically an alien race known as the Gelgameks) are molesting children and claim they need to continue the practice to receive gratification. They claim the "Holy Document of Vatican Law" does not prohibit the behavior, so Maxi wants to change the canon law to outlaw sodomy, as well as to allow sex with women. The Cardinal tells him that the Document cannot be changed as no one knows where it is. Maxi decides to try to find it. Meanwhile, Kyle has lost his patience with Cartman's incessant boasting and tells Cartman that he accepts the fact that he beat him fairly. This angers Cartman, as he wanted to hold his victory over Kyle's head indefinitely.

Maxi searches through the lower levels of the Vatican, and goes through a gauntlet in the style of Pitfall! in order to reach the Holy Document. But the Pope says they must first consult the highest power. He summons the "Queen Spider", which has for centuries been responsible for the pedophilia in the church, and declares that the Holy Document of Vatican Law cannot be changed. Angered by this, Maxi finally snaps and tears the Document in two, and the building begins to crumble. Maxi stands in front of the ruins, and tells everyone that Catholicism is not about the Holy Document of Vatican Law, molestation, or Queen Spiders, but about being a good person. He says by clouding the moral lessons of the Bible with needless ceremony and so many literal translations, the Vatican has caused people to reject religion and argues that "when they have no mythology to live their lives by, they just start spewing a bunch of crap out of their mouths". The parents, watching this on TV, regain their faith in God, deciding to stop shoving food up their rectums and to start going to church again, wanting to reconcile with God and their religion. Randy then vomits up another bowel movement.

Production
In the DVD commentary for this episode, Stone and Parker refer to their irritation towards arguments from more socially liberal/atheistic/secular-minded types of people, as well as from socially religious conservatives.  The scene where the parents discuss atheism while crapping out their mouths is based on Parker's annoyance with atheists. When Maxi searches for the Holy Document the scene is animated in the style of Pitfall! Randy's nightmare about the priest molesting the boys is done using footage from The Love Boat.

The Great Queen Spider was taken from "Planet of the Spiders", a 1974 serial of Doctor Who, and is later referenced in the 2017 Role-playing video game South Park: The Fractured but Whole.

Accuracy
The episode's suggestion that the Vatican enforces stricter bans on priests engaging in heterosexual sex has been disproven. In February 2019, the Vatican acknowledged that the Catholic Church had secretly enacted rules to protect clergy who not only violated their vow of celibacy, regardless of the gender of their sexual partner, but who also fathered children by doing so as well.

Home media
"Red Hot Catholic Love", along with the sixteen other episodes from South Park's sixth season, were released on a three-disc DVD set in the United States on October 11, 2005. The sets included brief audio commentaries by Parker and Stone for each episode. IGN gave the season a rating of 9/10.

References

External links 
 "Red Hot Catholic Love" Full episode at South Park Studios
 

Atheism in television
Catholicism in fiction
Television episodes about Christianity
Criticism of atheism
Cultural depictions of Pope John Paul II
Media coverage of Catholic Church sexual abuse scandals
South Park (season 6) episodes
Television episodes set in Italy
Television episodes set in Vatican City
Works about feces